Jean Gutweniger (13 November 1892 – 11 July 1979) was a Swiss gymnast and Olympic medalist. He competed at the 1924 Summer Olympics in Paris where he received silver medals in  pommel horse and horizontal bar, and a bronze medal in team combined exercises.

References

1892 births
1979 deaths
Swiss male artistic gymnasts
Gymnasts at the 1924 Summer Olympics
Olympic gymnasts of Switzerland
Olympic silver medalists for Switzerland
Olympic bronze medalists for Switzerland
Olympic medalists in gymnastics
Medalists at the 1924 Summer Olympics
20th-century Swiss people